Shukteyevo (Şüktäy) is a rural locality (a village) in Ulu-Telyaksky Selsoviet, Iglinsky District, Bashkortostan, Russia. The population was 14 as of 2010. There is 1 street.

Geography 
Shukteyevo is located 59 km northeast of Iglino (the district's administrative centre) by road. Kirovsky is the nearest rural locality.

References 

Rural localities in Iglinsky District